William Henrique Rodrigues da Silva (born 28 January 1992), known as William Henrique, is a Brazilian footballer who plays as a winger for V.League 1 club Hanoi FC.

Honours
Chiangrai United
Thai League 1: 2019
Thai FA Cup: 2018
Thai League Cup: 2018

Hanoi FC
Vietnamese Super Cup: 2022

External links
 

1992 births
Living people
People from Ribeirão Preto
Brazilian footballers
Association football wingers
Association football forwards
Campeonato Brasileiro Série A players
Campeonato Brasileiro Série B players
Grêmio Barueri Futebol players
Esporte Clube Vitória players
Agremiação Sportiva Arapiraquense players
Joinville Esporte Clube players
Ceará Sporting Club players
J1 League players
K League 2 players
William Henrique
Saudi First Division League players
V.League 1 players
Ansan Greeners FC players
William Henrique
William Henrique
Al-Shahania SC players
Ventforet Kofu players
Hajer FC players
Hanoi FC players
Brazilian expatriate footballers
Brazilian expatriate sportspeople in Japan
Expatriate footballers in Japan
Brazilian expatriate sportspeople in South Korea
Expatriate footballers in South Korea
Brazilian expatriate sportspeople in Thailand
Expatriate footballers in Thailand
Brazilian expatriate sportspeople in Qatar
Expatriate footballers in Qatar
Expatriate footballers in Saudi Arabia
Brazilian expatriate sportspeople in Saudi Arabia
Brazilian expatriate sportspeople in Vietnam
Expatriate footballers in Vietnam
Footballers from São Paulo (state)